A butterfly is a flying insect.

Butterfly may also refer to:

Companies
 Butterfly (company), an American film production company 1917–1918
 Butterfly (brand), used by Japanese table tennis apparel and equipment supplier Tamasu

Film and television

Film
 The Butterfly (1914 film), an American silent short film by Tom Ricketts
 Butterfly (1924 film), an American silent drama film by Clarence Brown
 Butterfly (1982 film), an American crime film by Matt Cimber
 Butterfly (1999 film) or Butterfly's Tongue, a Spanish film by José Luis Cuerda
 Butterfly (2000 film), a documentary about Julia Butterfly Hill by Doug Wolens
 The Butterfly (2001 film) or Nabi, a South Korean film by Moon Seung-wook
 The Butterfly (2002 film), a French film by Philippe Muyl
 Butterfly (2004 film), a Hong Kong film by Yan Yan Mak
 The Butterfly (2007 film), an Indonesian film by Nayato Fio Nuola
 Butterfly (2015 film), an Argentine film by Marco Berger
 Butterfly (upcoming film), an Indian Kannada-language film by Ramesh Aravind

Television
 Butterfly (TV series), a 2018 British drama miniseries
 "Butterfly" (Haven), a 2010 episode
 "Butterfly" (Teletubbies), a 1997 episode
 "The Butterfly" (The Amazing World of Gumball), a 2015 episode

Games and sports
 Butterfly (game), a two-player abstract strategy game
 Butterfly stroke, a swimming technique
 Butterfly style, a goaltending technique in ice hockey

Literature
 Butterfly (comics), Layla Miller, a Marvel Comics character
 Butterfly (novel), a 2009 novel by Sonya Hartnett
 Butterfly, a 1989 novel by Kathryn Harvey (Barbara Wood)
 The Butterfly (novel), a 1947 novel by James M. Cain
 The Butterfly, a 2000 children's book by Patricia Polacco

Music
 Butterfly Recordings, three American record labels
 Étude Op. 25, No. 9 (Chopin) or "Butterfly"
 The Butterflys, a 1960s-era group signed to Red Bird Records

Albums
 ButterFly (Barbra Streisand album), 1974
 Butterfly (Deen album), 2016
 Butterfly (Hollies album) or the title song, 1967
 Butterfly (Jolin Tsai album) or the title song, 2009
 Butterfly (Kimiko Kasai album), 1979
 Butterfly (L'Arc-en-Ciel album), 2012
 Butterfly (Mariah Carey album) or the title song (see below), 1997
 Butterfly (Natalie Merchant album) or the title song, 2017
 Butterfly (Sara Tunes album) or the title song, 2010
 Butterfly, by Ailee, 2019
 Butterfly, by Kelli Ali, 2009

Songs
 "Butterfly" (1957 song), written by Bernie Lowe and Kal Mann
 "Butterfly" (Crazy Town song), 2000
 "Butterfly" (Danyel Gérard song), 1970
 "Butterfly" (Kaela Kimura song), 2009
 "Butterfly" (Koda Kumi song), 2005
 "Butterfly" (Kylie Minogue song), 2001
 "Butterfly" (Loona song), 2019
 "Butterfly" (Mariah Carey song), 1997
 "Butterfly" (Smile.dk song), 1998
 "Butter-Fly", by Kōji Wada, 1999
 "Butterfly", by the Bee Gees, covered on Barry Gibb's album Greenfields, 2021
 "Butterfly", by BTS from The Most Beautiful Moment in Life, Pt. 2, 2015
 "Butterfly", by Candlebox from Lucy, 1995
 "Butterfly", by Cosmic Girls from Neverland, 2020
 "Butterfly", by Demi Lovato from Dancing with the Devil... the Art of Starting Over, 2021
 "Butterfly", by G-Dragon from Heartbreaker, 2009
 "Butterfly", by Grimes from Art Angels, 2015
 "Butterfly", by Herbie Hancock from Thrust, 1974
 "Butterfly", by Jason Mraz from We Sing. We Dance. We Steal Things., 2008
 "Butterfly", by Jessica Mauboy from Hilda, 2019
 "Butterfly", by Kehlani from While We Wait, 2019
 "Butterfly", by Lenny Kravitz from Mama Said, 1991
 "Butterfly", by Markus Feehily from Fire, 2015
 "Butterfly", by Perfume from Game, 2008
 "Butterfly", by Pink Floyd from 1965: Their First Recordings, 2015
 "Butterfly", by Screaming Trees from Sweet Oblivion, 1992
 "Butterfly", by Serj Tankian from Harakiri, 2012
 "Butterfly", by Take That from Beautiful World, 2006
 "Butterfly", by Tori Amos from the film soundtrack Higher Learning, 1995
 "Butterfly", by The Verve from A Storm in Heaven, 1993
 "Butterfly", by Weezer from Pinkerton, 1996
 "The Butterfly", by Little River Band from Too Late to Load, 1989

People
 Julia Butterfly Hill (born 1974), American activist and environmentalist
 Butterfly Boucher (born 1979), Australian singer-songwriter, instrumentalist, and producer
 Butterfly McQueen (1911–1995), American actress

Places
 Butterfly (constituency), Tuen Mun District, Hong Kong
 Butterfly, Kentucky, US

Technology
 BBN Butterfly, a 1980s massively parallel computer
 Butterfly (dinghy), a boat
 Butterfly (lighting), a cinema lighting methodology
 Butterfly Bomb, a German cluster bomb in World War II
 Butterfly joint in woodworking
 Butterfly knife, a Filipino-origin knife
 Butterfly loop, a mid-line knot
 Butterfly valve, a mechanic component of a carburetor
 Butterfly vibrator, a type of strap-on clitoral vibrator
 GibboGear Butterfly, an ultralite trike aircraft
 Butterfly needle, winged infusion set, in medical practice
 Butterfly, a roller coaster element
 Butterfly, the code-name and common name of the IBM ThinkPad 701 keyboard
 Buuterfly, a typeface by Wagner & Schmidt, licensed by Schriftguss AG

Other uses
 Butterfly (options), a financial trading strategy
 Butterfly dance, a dance move
 Butterfly stop, a railway station in Hong Kong
 Butterflying, a butchery technique

See also
 Butterflies (disambiguation)
 Butterfill, a surname
 "Butterfly, Butterfly (The Last Hurrah)", a 2010 song by a-ha
 Butterfly diagram, used to illustrate fast Fourier transforms
 Butterfly effect, the idea that small causes can have large effects
 Butterfly Koi, an ornamental fish
 Falter (German for Butterfly), a magazine
 Madame Butterfly (disambiguation)